Barouk is a village in the Chouf District of Mount Lebanon Governorate in Lebanon. Barouk is located 52 kilometers southeast of Beirut. Its average elevation is 1000 to 1200 meters above sea level and its total land area consists of 2,762 hectares. The village had 5,197 registered voters in 2010. Its inhabitants are predominantly Druze and Maronite and Melkite Christians.

Historically, Barouk is known for being the "land of good", because of its fountain, Nabeh-el-Barouk. The poet Rachid Nakhleh, the writer of the national hymn, Kulluna lel watan, was born in Barouk. The village is also well known for its apples and other fruits, and for its many pine and oak forests. Barouk is named after the adjacent mountain of Jabal el-Barouk, which stands 1,943 meters above sea level. The mountain also has the largest nature reserve in Lebanon, the Al Shouf Cedar Nature Reserve, and contains the oldest cedar forest in Lebanon.

References

Populated places in Chouf District
Druze communities in Lebanon
Maronite Christian communities in Lebanon
Melkite Christian communities in Lebanon
Tourist attractions in Lebanon